Jerome Warrington Harris , better known by his stage name RRose RRome, is a Brooklyn-based independent hip-hop artist and rapper. He has gained publicity for doing songs with Jadakiss, Chris Brown, and Maino.

Career
Harris began his music career in 2014, but had a passion for music since his childhood. He went on to practice his singing in a studio and has since released dozens of songs and music videos; his work has been featured on television in MTV and Music Choice as well as on the radio in WQHT and WWPR-FM. His song with Chris Brown titled "Draco" surpassed 300,000 went viral in 2017.

Discography

Albums
 Take this Serious
 Rose Gold
 The Sample

Singles
 "All Year"
 "Bucks n Billies"
 "Balenciaga"
 "Excellent"
 "Buss it"
 "Rocks and Roses"
 "You ain’t a Killer"
 "Money Calling"
 "Dry Cry"
 "Get Around"
 "What's the Issue"
 "Dope Fiend"
 "B.R.O.W.N."
 "Make it Count"

Featured in
 "Draco (freestyle)" with Chris Brown
 "No Time" with Maino
 "Ziploc" with Jadakiss
 "Like that" with Sheek Louch
 "Smack" with Murda Mook

References

1986 births
Living people
20th-century African-American people
21st-century American singers
21st-century American male singers
21st-century African-American male singers
African-American male rappers
Rappers from Brooklyn